CD-63 was a C Type class escort ship (Kaibōkan) of the Imperial Japanese Navy during the Second World War.

History
She was laid down by Mitsubishi at their Kobe Shipyard on 1 July 1944, launched on 20 September 1944, and completed and commissioned on 15 October 1944. During the war CD-63 was mostly busy on escort duties.

On 10 August 1945 CD-63 struck a mine in Nanao Bay, and was badly damaged and beached to prevent sinking. Struck from the Navy List on 30 September 1945, she was scrapped by 30 April 1948.

References

Additional sources

1944 ships
Ships built by Mitsubishi Heavy Industries
Type C escort ships
Maritime incidents in August 1945
World War II shipwrecks in the Sea of Japan